Hugo Anthony Meynell (23 March 1936 – 1 October 2021) was an English academic and author.

Academic career
Born in Meynell Langley, Derbyshire, England, half a year after the death of his father, Captain Godfrey Meynell, who was awarded the Victoria Cross for action against Afghan raiders in India's Khyber Pass, Hugo grew up as a member of an English family which arrived in England with the Norman conquest of England. His mother was Sophia Patricia (but known as Jill) née Lowis.

He was educated at Eton and at King's College at the University of Cambridge, where he obtained his PhD. 
After completing his graduate work Dr. Meynell taught at the University of Leeds before moving to the University of Calgary in 1981. He wrote thirteen academic books and numerous peer reviewed articles as well as regular book reviews in the Heythrop Journal and similar publications.

He was elected a member of the Royal Society of Canada in 1993, and is listed in the Canadian Who's Who.

Christian Rationalism
Meynell described himself as a "Christian Rationalist" in the tradition of Thomas Aquinas (1225–1274) and Bernard Lonergan (1904–1984), on whose work he has written. His numerous books include works on philosophy, psychology, and even music. A devout Roman Catholic convert, he had an evangelical outlook and sympathy for British and American Protestantism. In his later books he expressed a strong distaste for postmodernism and what he called "academic fads". Latterly, he was engaged in a study of contemporary atheism.

Books
Meynell's many publications include:
God and the World: the Coherence of Christian Theism,London, S.P.C.K., 1971
An Introduction to the Philosophy of Bernard Lonergan, New York : Barnes & Noble Books, 1976
Freud, Marx, and Morals, Totowa, N.J. : Barnes & Noble Books, 1981
The Intelligible Universe: A Cosmological Argument, Totowa, N.J. : Barnes & Noble, 1982
The Theology of Bernard Lonergan, Atlanta, Ga. : Scholars Press, 1986
The Art of Handel's Operas, Lewiston, N.Y. : E. Mellen Press, 1986
Is Christianity true?,Washington, D.C. : Catholic University of America Press, 1994
Redirecting philosophy: Reflections of the Nature of Knowledge from Plato to Lonergan,Toronto; Buffalo: University of Toronto Press, 1998
Postmodernism and the New Enlightenment,Washington, D.C. : Catholic University of America Press, 1999

References

1936 births
2021 deaths
People educated at Eton College
Alumni of King's College, Cambridge
British expatriate academics in Canada
Converts to Roman Catholicism
Academics of the University of Leeds
English Roman Catholics
People from Amber Valley
Handel scholars
Academic staff of the University of Calgary